Sternacutus is a genus of beetles in the family Cerambycidae, containing the following species:

 Sternacutus achirae (Monné & Monné, 2012)
 Sternacutus albidus (Monné, 2009)
 Sternacutus alienus (Melzer, 1932)
 Sternacutus angulistigma (Bates, 1885)
 Sternacutus annulicornis (White, 1855)
 Sternacutus argus (Monné & Monné, 2012)
 Sternacutus arietinus (Bates, 1872)
 Sternacutus barbiflavus (Martins & Monné, 1974)
 Sternacutus bicristatus (Melzer, 1935)
 Sternacutus caliginosus (Monné & Monné, 2012)
 Sternacutus cinerascens (Bates, 1863)
 Sternacutus cretatus (Monné & Martins, 1976)
 Sternacutus cribripennis (Bates, 1885)
 Sternacutus dimidiatus (Aurivillius, 1922)
 Sternacutus doctus (Bates, 1863)
 Sternacutus dorsalis (Melzer, 1935)
 Sternacutus griseostigma (Monné & Monné, 2012)    
 Sternacutus guttatus (Monné & Martins, 1976)
 Sternacutus jubapennis (Fisher, 1938)
 Sternacutus lateralis (Monné & Martins, 1976)
 Sternacutus moestus (Bates, 1885)
 Sternacutus mysticus (Bates, 1863)
 Sternacutus nyssodroides (Tippmann, 1960)
 Sternacutus orbiculus (Monné & Martins, 1976)
 Sternacutus spinicornis (Gilmour, 1962)
 Sternacutus striatus (Gilmour, 1962)
 Sternacutus strigosus (Bates, 1863)
 Sternacutus torquatus (Bates, 1881)
 Sternacutus zikani (Melzer, 1935)

References

Acanthocinini